Allegro Grandi (17 January 1907 – 23 April 1973) was an Italian cyclist. He competed in the individual and team road race events at the 1928 Summer Olympics. Grandi committed suicide in his bicycle shop in Caracas in 1973.

References

External links
 

1907 births
1973 suicides
Italian male cyclists
Olympic cyclists of Italy
Cyclists at the 1928 Summer Olympics
Cyclists from Bologna
Italian emigrants to Venezuela
Suicides in Venezuela
Death in Caracas